The Bishop of Singapore is the diocesan bishop for the Anglican Diocese of Singapore, founded in 1909.

History of the See

List of bishops

1881 George Hose, Bishop of Singapore, Labuan & Sarawak 1881
1909 Charles Ferguson-Davie
1927 Basil Roberts (1887–1947)
1941 Leonard Wilson
1949 Henry Baines
1961 Kenneth Sansbury
1966 Chiu Ban It
1982 Moses Tay (Archbishop of South East Asia, 1996–2000)
2000 John Chew (Archbishop of South East Asia, 2006–2012)
2012 Rennis Ponniah
2020 Titus Chung (consecrated 18 October 2020)

References

 
1909 establishments in British Malaya